Allan Cunningham (13 July 1791 – 27 June 1839) was an English botanist and explorer, primarily known for his travels in Australia to collect plants.

Early life 
Cunningham was born in Wimbledon, Surrey, England, the son of Allan Cunningham (head gardener at Wimbledon Park House), who came from Renfrewshire, Scotland, and his English wife Sarah (née Juson/Jewson née Dicken). Allan Cunningham was educated at a Putney private school, Reverend John Adams Academy and then went into a solicitor's office (a Lincoln's Inn Conveyancer). He afterwards obtained a position with William Townsend Aiton superintendent of Kew Gardens, and this brought him in touch with Robert Brown and Sir Joseph Banks.

Brazil and Australia (New South Wales)
On Banks' recommendation, Cunningham went to Brazil with James Bowie between 1814 and 1816 collecting specimens for Kew Gardens. On 28 September 1816 he sailed for Sydney where he arrived on 20 December 1816. He established himself at Parramatta. Among other explorations, he joined John Oxley's 1817 expedition beyond the Blue Mountains to the Lachlan and Macquarie rivers and shared in the privations of the 1,200 miles (1,930 km) journey. He collected specimens of about 450 species and gained valuable experience as an explorer.

Coastal exploration 
Cunningham traveled as the ship's botanist aboard HMS Mermaid under Phillip Parker King from 1817 to 1820. The Mermaid was of only 85 tons, but sailing on 22 December 1817 they reached King George Sound on 21 January 1818. Though their stay was short many specimens were found but the islands on the west coast were comparatively barren. Towards the end of March the Goulburn Islands on the north coast were reached and many new plants were discovered. They reached Timor on 4 June 1818 and, turning for home, arrived at Port Jackson on 29 July 1818. Cunningham's collections during this voyage included about 300 species.

Shortly after his return, Cunningham made an excursion south from Sydney, ascending the prominent peak of Mount Keira overlooking the Illawarra region and present day Wollongong. Towards the end of the year he made a voyage to Tasmania arriving at Hobart on 2 January 1819. He next visited Launceston and though often finding the botany interesting, he found little that was absolutely new, as Brown had preceded him. In May he went with King in the Mermaid on a second voyage to the north and north-west coasts. On this occasion they started up the east coast and Cunningham found many opportunities for adding to his collections. One of these was after the ship reached the mouth of the Endeavour River (the site of modern Cooktown) on 28 June 1819.

The circumnavigation of Australia was completed on 27 August when they reached Vernon Island in Clarence Strait. They again visited Timor and arrived back in Sydney on 12 January 1820. The third voyage to the north coast with King began on 15 June, but meeting bad weather the bowsprit was lost and a return was made for repairs. Sailing again on 13 July 1820 the northerly course was followed and eventually the continent was circumnavigated. Though they found the little vessel was in a bad state when they were on the north-west coast, and though serious danger was escaped until they were close to home, they were nearly wrecked off Botany Bay. The Mermaid was then condemned and the next voyage was on the Bathurst which was twice the size of the Mermaid. They left on 26 May 1821, the northern route was chosen, and when they were on the west coast of Australia it was found necessary to go to Mauritius to refit, where they arrived on 27 September 1821. They left after a stay of seven weeks and reached King George Sound on 24 December 1821. A sufficiently long stay was made for Cunningham to make an excellent collection of plants, and then turning on their tracks the Bathurst sailed up the west coast and round the north of Australia. Sydney was reached again on 25 April 1822. Cunningham provided a chapter on botany to King's Narrative of a Survey.

Further exploration of eastern Australia 

In September 1822 Cunningham went on an expedition over the Blue Mountains and arrived at Bathurst on 14 October 1822 and returned to Parramatta in January 1823. His account of about 100 plants met with will be found in Geographical Memoirs on New South Wales, edited by Barron Field, 1825, under the title "A Specimen of the Indigenous Botany ... between Port Jackson and Bathurst".

In 1823 Cunningham set out from the upper Hunter River to explore inside the Great Dividing Range. With five men and five horses, he set out from Bathurst to explore from the Cudgegong River, passing through Rylstone to Coolah and then eastwards to Scone and returning to Coolah through Merriwa. He examined the Cudgegong and Goulburn Rivers. On 2 June passing through Coolah to the north east, he explored Pandora's Pass, which could have opened out a fair and practicable road to Liverpool Plains. He returned to Bathurst through an undeveloped Mudgee on 27 June 1823. 
In September 1824 Cunningham accompanied John Oxley on his second expedition to Moreton Bay and explored up the Brisbane River.

Cunningham also undertook an expedition to what is now Canberra in 1824. He travelled with three convicts, three horses and a cart and he travelled via Lake Bathurst, Captains Flat and the valley in which flows the Queanbeyan River. Poor weather prevented him from continuing his journey south.

Cunningham had long wished to visit New Zealand and on 28 August 1826 he was able to sail on a whaler. He was hospitably received by the missionaries in the Bay of Islands, was able to do much botanical work, and returned to Sydney on 20 January 1827. Accounts of his work in New Zealand will be found in Hooker's Companion to the Botanical Magazine, 1836, and Annals of Natural History, 1838 and 1839.

Cunningham set out to explore the area to the west of Moreton Bay in 1827, crossing to the west of the Great Dividing Range from the Hunter Region and travelling north. In June 1827, Cunningham climbed to the top of Mount Dumaresq (near what is now Clintonvale close to Maryvale) and after wrote in his diary that this lush area was ideal for settlement. Exploring around Mount Dumaresq, Cunningham found a pass, now known as Cunninghams Gap.

Cunningham returned to the Moreton Bay penal colony in 1828, setting off from Brisbane with Patrick Logan, Charles Fraser and five men to find Mount Warning and to establish the route to Cunningham's Gap which he did, on 24 July. The peaks on either side of the gap were also named, Mount Cordeaux and Mount Mitchell. After exploring the McPherson Range area, Cunningham travelled on the south side of the Gap whereas the highway today runs further north, through the gap, from the small township of Aratula. Spicer's Gap which runs parallel to Cunningham's Gap was actually the pass first identified by Cunningham in 1827. After its rediscovery by Henry Alphen in 1847, Spicer's Gap was used as a stagecoach route. In 1829, Cunningham explored the Brisbane River.

Contributions to botany 

Australia's most prolific plant collector of the early nineteenth century, Cunningham had been sent to Australia to expand the collection at the King' Garden at Kew and he was given the title of "King's Collector for the Royal Garden at Kew". He was so successful that a hothouse built for specimens from Africa was renamed "Botany Bay House". Although his main role was to collect propagation material, his lasting legacy are his herbarium sheets which are thought by his biographer, Anthony Orchard, to exceed 20,000.

It is often thought that Cunningham published few papers on botany and in his obituary, John Lindley wrote, "How little he regarded posthumous fame is seen by the fewness of his published works, a brief sketch of the Flora of New Zealand being the only systematic account of his Botanical discoveries...". In fact, although he was effectively barred from publishing on botany whilst employed as "King's Collector", he nevertheless later published seven major papers, and 57 shorter papers on subjects including taxonomy, geology, physical geography and zoology. He was one of the first scientists to publish papers on botanical geography.

Cunningham was concerned that many of his discoveries sent to Kew were not published, allowing others, including William Baxter to be credited with their discovery. (Baxter had risked arrest and a possible flogging for undermining Cunningham's work by sending specimens to commercial interests.) When Cunningham returned to London,
he sent duplicates of his herbarium specimens to other botanists, including de Candolle, Schauer, William Jackson Hooker, Bentham, Lindley and others, who published his descriptions with acknowledgement to "A.Cunn.".

Later life 
In 1831, Cunningham returned to England, but went back to Australia in 1837 on board  as government botanist, resigning the following year on finding that he was required to grow vegetables for government officials. On 27 June 1839, he died of consumption in Sydney, and was buried in the Devonshire Street Cemetery. In 1901, his remains were "reverently removed" and re-interred in an obelisk within the Royal Botanic Gardens in Sydney.

Works

Legacy 

Some of Australia's plants: Araucaria cunninghamii (hoop pine), Archontophoenix cunninghamiana (Bangalow palm), Banksia cunninghamii, Lysiphyllum cunninghamii (jigal), Casuarina cunninghamiana (river sheoak), Centipeda cunninghamii (old man weed), Ficus cunninghamii, Medicosma cunninghamii (bone wood), Nothofagus cunninghamii (myrtle tree, Tasmania), Pennantia cunninghamii (brown beech), and Polyosma cunninghamii (rainforest featherwood) commemorate Allan and his brother Richard, a botanist. The Cunningham Highway is named in honour of Allan. The genus Alania was created by Endlicher in Cunningham's honour. Robert Brown named the conifer genus Cunninghamia after both Allan Cunningham and Dr. James Cunningham, a British doctor who introduced the trees into cultivation in 1702.

A species of Australian lizard, Egernia cunninghami, is named in honour of Allan Cunningham.

The Australian federal seat of Cunningham, which stretches from Port Kembla in the south of Wollongong to Heathcote in Southern Sydney, was named after him in honour of his being the first European explorer to visit the Illawarra region.

The locality of Allan, Queensland was named after him.

References 

 Cunningham's Pandora's Pass, Tracking and Mapping the Explorers, 1823, Volume 4, 2nd Edition, Sunnyland Press

External links 

The Allan Cunningham Project dedicated to documenting accurate information related to Allan Cunningham
Toowoomba City Council
Indian Academy of Sciences
National Library of Australia
Kew Gardens
Colonial Secretary's papers 1822-1877 via State Library of Queensland includes digitised letters and reports made by Cunningham to the Colonial Secretary of New South Wales regarding the Moreton Bay Penal Settlement

1791 births
1839 deaths
Phycologists
English botanists
English explorers
English taxonomists
British pteridologists
Botanists active in Australia
Botanical collectors active in Australia
Botanists active in South America
Botanists with author abbreviations
Explorers of Australia
Explorers of Queensland
Fellows of the Linnean Society of London
Maritime exploration of Australia
English people of Scottish descent
People from Wimbledon, London
People from Parramatta
Pre-Separation Queensland
19th-century explorers
19th-century British botanists